Kuranda is a surname. Notable people with the surname include:

 Hugo Kuranda (1910–?), Austrian skeleton racer
 Ignaz Kuranda (1812–1884), Bohemian-Austrian deputy and political writer
 Richard Kuranda (born 1969), American actor and theatrical director